Keiko Sugita (born March 1908) was a Japanese politician. She was one of the first group of women elected to the House of Representatives in 1946.

Biography
Sugita graduated from the English Department of Japan Women's University in 1929.

After World War II, Sugita joined the Liberal Party. With her husband unable to run for office, she was a Liberal candidate in Ibaragi in the 1946 general elections (the first in which women could vote), and was elected to the House of Representatives.

With Shogo having died in 1946, Sugita later ran an inn at Shima Onsen.

References

1908 births
Japan Women's University alumni
20th-century Japanese women politicians
20th-century Japanese politicians
Members of the House of Representatives (Japan)
Liberal Party (Japan, 1945) politicians
Date of death unknown